Cattle tick can refer to any of several species of ticks that parasitize cattle, including:

 Haemaphysalis longicornis, the Asian longhorned tick
 Rhipicephalus annulatus, the North American cattle tick
 Rhipicephalus microplus, the Asian blue tick

Arthropod common names